The fourth season of MasterChef Canada originally premiered on March 3, 2017 on CTV before concluding on June 1. In the United States, this season started showing on The Cooking Channel on October 10, 2017. In the finale, Trevor Connie was announced as the winner of the season. Connie also guest starred in an episode of season five. This was the first season to forsake the show's traditional audition phase, instead directly facing the twenty-four finalists with a surprise challenge in their hometowns that would be finished in the MasterChef Canada kitchen.

Runner-up Dorothea "Thea" VanHerwaarden, who originally finished second, Mai Nguyen, who originally finished fourth and Barrie McConachie, who originally finished third place all returned to MasterChef Canada: Back to Win. Barrie initially placed 11th, but returned following April Lee Baker's back injury and placed 9th. Mai placed 5th. Thea placed third.

Top 12

Elimination table

 (WINNER) This cook won the competition.
 (RUNNER-UP) This cook finished in second place.
 (WIN) The cook won the individual challenge (Mystery Box Challenge or Elimination Test).
 (WIN) The cook was on the winning team in the Team Challenge and was directly advanced to the next round.
 (HIGH) The cook was one of the top entries in the Mystery Box Challenge, but did not win, or received considerable praise during an Elimination Test.
 (PT) The cook was on the losing team in the Team Challenge or did not win the individual challenge, but won the Pressure Test.
 (IN) The cook was not selected as a top entry or bottom entry in an individual challenge.
 (IN) The cook was not selected as a top entry or bottom entry in a team challenge.
 (IMM) The cook did not have to compete in that round of the competition and was safe from elimination.
 (IMM) The cook was selected by Mystery Box Challenge winner and did not have to compete in the Elimination Test. 
 (PT) The cook was on the losing team in the Team Challenge, competed in the Pressure Test, and advanced.
 (NPT) The cook was on the losing team in the Team Challenge, but was exempted from the Pressure Test
 (RET) The cook was eliminated but came back to compete to return to the competition.
 (LOW) The cook was one of the bottom entries in an individual elimination challenge or pressure test and advanced.
 (WDR) The cook withdrew for injury and cannot continue the competition.
 (ELIM) The cook was eliminated from MasterChef.

Episodes

References

MasterChef Canada
2017 Canadian television seasons